The , or GSAPS, is an independent graduate school focusing on social sciences and international relations. GSAPS was established in April 1998 on the Waseda Campus of Waseda University in Tokyo, Japan. GSAPS students, faculty, and alumni come from more than 50 countries, making it the university's foremost hub for international graduate education and one of Japan's most culturally diverse graduate institutes.

Location
The GSAPS Building (No.19) is located at Waseda University Main Campus, Shinjuku, Tokyo, Japan.

Cooperative institutions
GSAPS conducts regular teaching and research activities with the London School of Economics and Political Science, Graduate Institute of International and Development Studies, National University of Singapore, Seoul National University, and Chulalongkorn University, among other partner schools.  Also, through the European Commission's Erasmus Mundus international mobility programme, GSAPS administers a joint doctoral program on Globalisation, the EU, and Multilateralism in partnership with Université Libre de Bruxelles in Belgium, University of Warwick in the United Kingdom, Libera Università Internazionale degli Studi Sociali in Italy, Université de Genève in Switzerland, and Fudan University in China.

GSAPS is an affiliate member of the Association of Professional Schools of International Affairs (APSIA), a network of leading international relations and public policy schools from around the world.

GSAPS has recently spearheaded the Campus Asia program, which is aimed at establishing an EUI-type institution in Asia. This effort is currently underway in conjunction with Peking University, Korea University, Thammasat University, and Nanyang Technological University.

Teaching and research
GSAPS' core teaching and research areas are in East and Southeast Asian area studies, international relations, and international cooperation and policy studies. Research seminars and classes are organized around these three themes. The School operates on a quarterly calendar, with English and Japanese classes held from April to July (Spring), August (Summer), September to January (Fall), and February (Winter).

Student profile
As of May 1, 2011, there are total 427 students including 283 of Master students and 144 of PHD students. 69.6% of MA students are from overseas, and only 30.4% are Japanese local students. The GSA, the school's official student organization, frequently organizes social, academic, and career-related events.

Faculty members
Satoshi Amako (Ph.D. Sociology, Hitotsubashi University)
Nobuhiko Fuwa (Ph.D. Agricultural and Resource Economics, University of California-Berkeley)
Sachiko Hirakawa (Ph.D. International Relations, Waseda University)
Akiko Kamogawa (Ed.D., Waseda University)
Yasushi Katsuma (LL.M, Ph.D. Development Studies, University of Wisconsin-Madison)
Yukio Kawamura (Master of Laws, University of Miami)
Toshiharu Kitamura (M.Phil., Oxford University)
Hideo Kobayashi (Doctor of Social Science, Tokyo Metropolitan University)
Kazuo Kuroda (Ph.D Sociology of Education, Cornell University)
Gracia Liu-Farrer (Ph.D. Sociology, University of Chicago)
Shunji Matsuoka (Ph.D., Hiroshima University)
Hitoshi Mitomo (Doctor of Urban and Regional Planning Studies, University of Tsukuba)
Eiji Murashima
Toshio Obi (Ph.D. Global Information and Telecommunication Studies, Waseda University)
Glenda Roberts (Ph.D. Anthropology, Cornell University)
Hatsue Shinohara (Ph.D. History, University of Chicago)
Masaya Shiraishi (Ph.D. Sociology, University of Tokyo)
Chikako Ueki (Ph.D. Political Science, MIT)
Shujiro Urata (Ph.D. Economics, Stanford University)
Michio Yamaoka (Ph.D. Social Science-International Relations, Waseda University)

See also
GSAPS
GSAPS Student Association

References

Waseda University
Asian studies